Colonanek Pass (English: Colona is a name, nek is neck) is situated in the Eastern Cape province of South Africa on the road between Mount Frere and Cedarville.

Mountain passes of the Eastern Cape